The women's 100m backstroke events at the 2022 World Para Swimming Championships were held at the Penteada Olympic Swimming Complex in Madeira between 12 and 18 June.

Medalists

Results

S2

S6
Final
Eight swimmers from eight nations took part.

S7
Final
Seven swimmers from four nations took part.

S8

S9

S10

S11

S12
Final
Eight swimmers from eight nations took part.

S13
Final
Six swimmers from five nations took part.

S14

References

2022 World Para Swimming Championships
2022 in women's swimming